The Union County Magnet High School (UCMHS) is a magnet public high school located in Scotch Plains on the Union County Vocational Technical Schools Campus, serving the vocational and technical educational needs of students in ninth through twelfth grades throughout Union County, United States. The school's goal is to prepare students for college/vocational training utilizing technology through problem solving, project-based learning, and interdisciplinary education.  Students must apply to enter the school and the school accepts one-thirds of applicants. The school is accredited by the Middle States Association of Colleges and Schools Commission on Elementary and Secondary Schools since 1946.

As of the 2021–22 school year, the school had an enrollment of 308 students and 14.9 classroom teachers (on an FTE basis), for a student–teacher ratio of 20.7:1. There were 15 students (4.9% of enrollment) eligible for free lunch and 5 (1.6% of students) eligible for reduced-cost lunch.

Awards, recognition and rankings
Union County Magnet High School was recognized by Governor Jim McGreevey in 2003 as one of 25 schools selected statewide for the First Annual Governor's School of Excellence award.

Union County Magnet High School was awarded the Blue Ribbon School Award of Excellence by the United States Department of Education, the highest award an American school can receive, during the 2004–05 school year. In September 2013, the school was honored for a second time when it was one of 15 in New Jersey to be recognized by the Department of Education as part of the National Blue Ribbon Schools Program, an award called the "most prestigious honor in the United States' education system" and which Education Secretary Arne Duncan described as honoring schools that "represent examples of educational excellence".

Union County Magnet High School was cited as a "Public Elite", one of 22 such schools recognized nationwide in Newsweek magazine's listing of "America's Best High Schools" in the May 8, 2006, issue. Newsweek described that the school's "Focus is on science, math and technology".

In Newsweek's May 22, 2007 issue, ranking the country's top high schools, Union County Magnet High School was listed in 598th place, the 12th-highest ranked school in New Jersey.

In 2005–06, the school averaged a 1922 combined SAT score, fourth highest of all public high schools statewide.

In 2008, Magnet High School, along with the Academy for Allied Health Sciences, was named #1 youth per capita in the entire nation by the American Cancer Society for their Relay for Life.  In total, the schools raised over $73,000.

In 2009, Magnet High School, along with the other UCVTS schools, was named #1 youth per capita in the entire nation by the American Cancer Society for their Relay For Life program.  In total, the schools raised over $115,000.

Schooldigger.com ranked the school as one of 16 schools tied for first out of 381 public high schools statewide in its 2011 rankings (unchanged from the 2010 ranking) which were based on the combined percentage of students classified as proficient or above proficient on the language arts literacy (100.0%) and mathematics (100.0%) components of the High School Proficiency Assessment (HSPA).

In 2011, Magnet High School was named a Silver Medal School and ranked #70 in the Nation as one of the best math and science high school according to U.S. News & World Report.

In its 2013 report on  "America's Best High Schools", The Daily Beast ranked the school 65th in the nation among participating public high schools and 5th among schools in New Jersey. The school was ranked 102nd in the nation and fifth in New Jersey on the list of "America's Best High Schools 2012" prepared by The Daily Beast / Newsweek, with rankings based 25% each on graduation rate, matriculation rate for college and number of Advanced Placement / International Baccalaureate courses taken per student, with 10% based on average scores on the SAT / ACT, 10% on AP/IB scores and an additional 5% based on the number of AP/IB courses available to students.

In Newsweek's 2014 "America's Best High Schools", Magnet was ranked 2nd in the nation.

In its listing of "America's Best High Schools 2016", the school was ranked 4th out of 500 best high schools in the country; it was ranked 2nd among all high schools in New Jersey.

Admissions
Applicants to the high school proceed through the admission process as follows:
Attendance at an information session 
Submission of an application to the Principal's office
Admissions examination
Notification of acceptance

The following criteria will be considered for admission:
Final Grades for the 7th-grade year.
First marking period grades for the 8th-grade year.
Admissions test exam.

Schedule
Magnet classes run on a block scheduling system. Two revolving days (A/B) are broken up into five blocks (1/2, 3/4, 5/6, 7/8, 9/10). Each block is 83 minutes in length, with the exception of 5/6. Depending on the student's grade level, periods 5 and 6 are Co-Curricular and the Lunch period, in some order.

Graduation Requirements
In order to graduate from the Union County Magnet High School, a student is required to have taken:
Four years of English
Freshmen: English I - World Literature
Sophomore: English II - Early American Literature
Junior: English III - Modern American Literature
Senior: English IV: Choice of two courses (British Literature or AP English Language and Composition)
Four years of Mathematics. Mathematics courses depend on an individual's skill level, which is determined based on an initial assessment in the 8th grade year.  Students are placed into one of the following classes each year:
 Combined Algebra (Algebra 1 & 2)
 Geometry/Trigonometry
 Math Analysis (Pre-Calculus)
 AP Calculus AB
 AP Calculus BC
 Multivariable Calculus 
 Mathematical Statistics and Data Sciences
Four years of Science
Freshmen: Biology I, Scientific Inquiry & Analysis
Sophomore: Chemistry I, choice of Physics I
Junior: Physics I (if not taken yet), AP Physics C: Mechanics (if Physics I taken)
Senior: Choice of: AP Biology, AP Chemistry, AP Physics C: Mechanics, AP Physics C: Electricity and Magnetism, Bioinformatics,  Microbiology, Environmental Engineering, etc.
Four Years of Fitness/Health
Four Years of Technology
Freshmen: Technology & Design
Sophomore: Introduction to Engineering and Digital Modeling 
Junior: Introduction to Programming/Advanced Manufacturing and Product Management
Senior: Introduction to Architecture/Architectural CAD Design or Internship
Three Years of Social Studies
Freshmen: World History
Sophomore: US History I
Junior: US History II
Three Years of a World Language
 Spanish I - Spanish IV
 AP Spanish Language and Culture
 AP Spanish Literature and Culture
 Linguistics
One year of Visual and Performing Arts
Integrated into Fitness
One half year of Career Education
This requirement is integrated into other courses and does not impact scheduling.
One half year of Financial Literacy
Course is taken online

Culture and extracurricular activities

Magnet is accepting and open to new cultures and tries to recognize and celebrate these cultures through the Multicultural Club and the French Club.  In addition to these clubs, there is also drama club, Science Olympiad, and math league for those interested in science and math competitions, FIRST Robotics Competition, chess club, yearbook committee, class councils (one for each grade), and student council (whole school).  Most clubs meet during lunch.

The school holds dances about once a month and annually, Magnet hosts a talent show and the Coffee House, which is put together by the drama club. In Spring 2006, the drama club put on its first full-length production since 2003. Since 2006, the drama club included a musical group, and in 2007, musicals and singing acts were included in the annual "Coffeehouse" production.

The second largest club within the school district is the 1257 Robotics Team. Because the school is oriented to math and science, the FIRST robotics team receives a lot of support. Although disbanded in 2006 due to loss of the founding members, the 1257 robotics team was reformed in the 2008–09 school year and is going strong once again.

Being enrolled in an engineering school, a few Magnet students also compete in the annual Union County College bridge building competition, which consists of teams of about five people each from all over the county. Teams are divided into novice and advanced categories, and each team must build a bridge with the given specifications (they change every year).

A new club at Magnet, which began in the 2007–08 school year, is the SMAC (Student Movement Against Cancer) club. The club was started by two students, and its main objective is to schedule, plan, and organize the annual Relay For Life held at the school.

Magnet does not offer any varsity sports, but students are allowed to join sports teams in their home districts, provided they do not pose any scheduling conflicts. The Union County Vocational Technical School district offers after school intramurals.

Clubs offered to students through both Magnet and the UCVTS district include Art Club, Bridge Building Club, Chess Club, Class Councils (Freshman, Sophomore, Junior, and Senior), SMAC, Dance Club, Drama Club (and Tech Crew), Future Business Leaders of America, Intramurals, Marine Corps,  Math League, Multicultural Club, National Honor Society, News Club, Newspaper Club, Peer Mediation, Physics Club, Robotics Club, Science Olympiad, Spanish Club, Spanish National Honor Society, Student Council, and Yearbook Club.

Building
The building that houses UCMHS was constructed in the 1960s and housed a portion of Union County College (UCC) through the 1970s. It was abandoned through the mid-1990s when the UCVTSD had the building gutted and renovated. UCMHS opened in 1997 and since then the building has seen minor renovations and the addition of a glass atrium to the fitness center. Following the major renovations in the mid-1990s, the building was named Mancuso Hall after the Chairman of the Union County Board of Education at the time.

The facade of the building features faux-stone over the staircases, which project from the building, and a series of white and brown gravel coated concrete panels, each containing a trapezoidal window. 

Magnet is located in Scotch Plains on a campus which is home to Union County Vocational-Technical School, the Academy for Information Technology, the Academy for Allied Health Sciences, and the Union County (or John H. Stamler) Police Academy.  The campus also has a NJ Transit bus stop and a soccer field.

In 2008, construction began on an addition to the Magnet building. This addition serves as the site of the Performing Arts school. The plans included a bridge linking the building with the addition, which will be located in one of the last free patches of ground on campus, over a frequently used path leading from a parking lot to the front door of the Magnet High School. These plans were finished in 2010.  The Union County Vocational-Technical Schools (UCVTS) has now changed from an open, spacious environment into a more urban environment.

Legal issues
There are 21 municipal school districts that are contained within the Union County Vocational Technical Schools District (UCVTSD). Following the creation of this school in 1997, a number of these districts filed suit against UCMHS. Scotch Plains petitioned the New Jersey Department of Education to force the exclusion of students from their district from the Magnet School. Rahway, New Jersey refused to allow Rahway students attending Magnet to participate in Rahway extracurricular programs.  Their argument was that Magnet was taking the best students away from the home districts and that Magnet was drawing funds away from the home districts.

The final case against UCMHS was the case launched by the City of Linden. It was resolved late in 2002 in favor of UCMHS. Linden ran a science school within its own district where it sent its gifted and talented students. They argued that their program was comparable to UCMHS and they should not, therefore, be required to pay tuition for students attending  the county school. The UCMHS argued that the programs were not comparable, as evidenced by Linden students desiring to leave their home district in favor of Magnet.

Magnet won each of these suits because it is, legally, a Vocational-Technical school (a school which offers a vocational education) and offers vocational certifications. State law requires local school districts pay tuition for students who attend the county vocational school.

Recently, as a result of extensive state budget cuts, the Board of Education of the Springfield Public Schools announced its plan in 2010 to refuse to pay tuition for students attending several of the schools on the UCVTS campus, on the grounds that it has comparable programs in engineering, performing arts, and health-care training.  The Springfield Board of Education believes that, in the absence of any state funding to offset the cost of sending students to the Magnet, Performing Arts, and Allied Health high schools, it should not be obligated to pay to send its students to these schools.

References

External links
Union County Magnet High School's website

Data for Union County Magnet High School, National Center for Education Statistics
FRC Team 1257/Parallel Universe
Article in newspaper on the proposal of the Magnet school
September 22, 2000 Decision by State Commissioner of Education Concerning the Magnet School (the Scotch Plains-Fanwood decision)
July 12, 1999 Decision by State Commissioner of Education regarding refusal of Roselle Park Board of Education to pay tuition for students attending Union County Magnet High School

1997 establishments in New Jersey
Educational institutions established in 1997
Magnet schools in New Jersey
NCSSS schools
Public high schools in Union County, New Jersey
Scotch Plains, New Jersey